Arev (Արեւ in Armenian) is an Armenian language daily published in Egypt by the Armenian Democratic Liberal Party (ADL - Ramgavar Party)

It was established in 1915 with the first issue published on May 11, 1915. 

The newspaper also published until 2009 Arev Monthly, an Arabic monthly magazine, covering Armenian subjects, and particularly matters related to the Armenian Cause and Arab-Armenian relations.

References

Links
Archive

1915 establishments in Egypt
Armenian Democratic Liberal Party
Armenian diaspora in Egypt
Armenian-language newspapers
Daily newspapers published in Egypt
Publications established in 1915
Newspapers published in Cairo
Non-Arabic-language newspapers published in Egypt